Copa or COPA may refer to:

COPA
COPA may refer to:

 Computer Operator Programming Assistant. trade of ITI 
 Child Online Protection Act, a former U.S. law to protect minors from certain material on the internet
 Canadian Owners and Pilots Association
 Cirrus Owners and Pilots Association
 Parliamentary Conference of the Americas
 COPA (gene), a human gene that encodes the coatomer subunit alpha protein
 Controlling Profitability Analysis, Profitability Analysis (SAP)
COPA-COGECA, a union of European farmers

Copa
Copa may refer to:

 Copa Heizung GmbH, COPA branded hydronic steel panel and bathroom radiator supplier based in Germany
 Copa Airlines, an international airline based in Panama
 Copa America, the main association football competition of the South American men's national football teams
 Copa (spider), a genus of spiders in the family Corinnidae
 Copacabana (nightclub), a nightclub in New York City
 Copa Room, now-defunct Las Vegas nightclub at The Sands Hotel
 CoPa, a short-lived nickname for Comerica Park in Detroit
 Boubacar Barry, Ivorian footballer
 Copa (mountain), a peak in the Cordillera Blanca mountain range of the Peruvian Andes

See also

COPAA
COPPA